Living in the End Times is a book by Slovenian philosopher Slavoj Žižek published by Verso Books in 2010.

Summary 
Žižek shows the cultural and political forms of these stages of ideological avoidance and political protest, from New Age obscurantism to violent religious fundamentalism. Concluding with a compelling argument for the return of a Marxian critique of political economy, Žižek also divines the wellsprings of a potentially communist culture—from literary utopias like Kafka's community of mice to the collective of freak outcasts in the television series Heroes.

References 

2010 non-fiction books
Books by Slavoj Žižek
Communist books
Political philosophy literature
Verso Books books